Connor Adam McGough (born August 14, 1995) is a former professional Canadian football defensive lineman who played for the Hamilton Tiger-Cats and Calgary Stampeders in the Canadian Football League (CFL). He played U Sports football at the University of Calgary. McGough was selected fourth overall in the 2017 CFL Draft.

University career
McGough played U Sports football for the Calgary Dinos from 2013 to 2016. He was named a CIS Second Team All-Canadian in 2014 and was a member of Hardy Cup championship teams in 2013 and 2016.

Professional career

Hamilton Tiger-Cats
McGough was drafted by the Hamilton Tiger-Cats in the first round, fourth overall, in the 2017 CFL Draft and signed with the team on May 24, 2017. He played in 51 games over three years with the Tiger-Cats where he recorded 14 defensive tackles, 33 special teams tackles, one sack, and two forced fumbles. He became a free agent upon the expiry of his contract on February 11, 2020.

Calgary Stampeders
On the first day of free agency, on February 11, 2020, McGough signed with the Calgary Stampeders. However, the 2020 CFL season was cancelled and he did not play in 2020. He then retired just prior to the 2021 season due to health reasons and did not play in 2021. He re-signed with the Stampeders on February 24, 2022. However, he was once again decided to retire in May 2022 due to myocarditis which had caused him to miss the 2021 season.

References

External links
Calgary Stampeders bio

Living people
1995 births
Calgary Dinos football players
Calgary Stampeders players
Hamilton Tiger-Cats players
Canadian football defensive linemen
Players of Canadian football from Alberta
Sportspeople from Medicine Hat